Photon energy is the energy carried by a single photon. The amount of energy is directly proportional to the photon's electromagnetic frequency and thus, equivalently, is inversely proportional to the wavelength. The higher the photon's frequency, the higher its energy. Equivalently, the longer the photon's wavelength, the lower its energy.

Photon energy can be expressed using any unit of energy. Among the units commonly used to denote photon energy are the electronvolt (eV) and the joule (as well as its multiples, such as the microjoule). As one joule equals 6.24 × 1018 eV, the larger units may be more useful in denoting the energy of photons with higher frequency and higher energy, such as gamma rays, as opposed to lower energy photons as in the optical and radio frequency regions of the electromagnetic spectrum.

Formulas

Physics 
Photon energy is directly proportional to frequency. 

where
 is energy
 is the Planck constant
 is frequency

This equation is known as the Planck–Einstein relation.

Additionally, 

where
E is photon energy 
λ is the photon's wavelength
c is the speed of light in vacuum
h is the Planck constant

The photon energy at 1 Hz is equal to 6.62607015 × 10−34 J

That is equal to 4.135667697 × 10−15 eV

Electronvolt 

Energy is often measured in electronvolts.

To find the photon energy in electronvolts using the wavelength in micrometres, the equation is approximately

This equation only holds if the wavelength is measured in micrometers.

The photon energy at 1 μm wavelength, the wavelength of near infrared radiation, is approximately 1.2398 eV.

In chemistry, quantum physics and optical engineering 
See 

where
E is photon energy (joules),
h is the Planck constant
The Greek letter ν (nu) is the photon's frequency.

Examples
An FM radio station transmitting at 100 MHz emits photons with an energy of about 4.1357 × 10−7 eV. This minuscule amount of energy is approximately 8 × 10−13 times the electron's mass (via mass-energy equivalence).

Very-high-energy gamma rays have photon energies of 100 GeV to over 1 PeV (1011 to 1015 electronvolts) or 16 nanojoules to 160 microjoules. This corresponds to frequencies of 2.42 × 1025 to 2.42 × 1029 Hz.

During photosynthesis, specific chlorophyll molecules absorb red-light photons at a wavelength of 700 nm in the photosystem I, corresponding to an energy of each photon of ≈ 2 eV ≈ 3 × 10−19 J ≈ 75 kBT, where kBT denotes the thermal energy. A minimum of 48 photons is needed for the synthesis of a single glucose molecule from CO2 and water (chemical potential difference 5 × 10−18 J) with a maximal energy conversion efficiency of 35%.

See also
Photon
Electromagnetic radiation
Electromagnetic spectrum
Planck constant
Planck–Einstein relation
Soft photon

References

Foundational quantum physics
Electromagnetic spectrum
Photons